Paola Morel (born 29 October 1996) is a Puerto Rican handball player who plays for the club Rio Grande Handball. She is member of the Puerto Rican national team. She competed at the 2015 World Women's Handball Championship in Denmark.

References

1996 births
Living people
Puerto Rican female handball players
21st-century Puerto Rican women